Urh Kastelic (born 27 February 1996) is a Slovenian handball goalkeeper who plays for TBV Lemgo Lippe and the Slovenian national team.

He participated at the 2017 World Men's Handball Championship. In 2014 he won gold medal at Youth Olympic Games in Nanjing, China.

References

External links

1996 births
Living people
People from Brežice
Slovenian male handball players
Expatriate handball players
Slovenian expatriate sportspeople in Hungary
Slovenian expatriate sportspeople in Croatia
Slovenian expatriate sportspeople in Germany
SC Pick Szeged players
RK Zagreb players
Frisch Auf Göppingen players
Handball-Bundesliga players
Youth Olympic gold medalists for Slovenia
Handball players at the 2014 Summer Youth Olympics
Mediterranean Games competitors for Slovenia
Competitors at the 2018 Mediterranean Games
21st-century Slovenian people